David Campbell may refer to:

Academia
 David Kelly Campbell (born 1944), American physicist
 David George Campbell (born 1949), American professor and writer
 David Campbell (Australian political scientist) (born 1961), Australian political scientist
 David E. Campbell (political scientist) (born 1971), American political scientist

Entertainment and literature
 David Campbell (poet) (1915–1979), Australian poet
 David Campbell (painter) (born 1936), American realist painter
 David Ray Campbell (born 1954), American television writer, theater producer, and comedy manager
 David E. Campbell (sound engineer), American sound engineer

Law
David Campbell (judge, born 1750) (1750–1812), territorial and state judge in North Carolina and Tennessee
David G. Campbell (born 1952), American federal judge
David Campbell (legal academic) (born 1958), British legal academic

Music
David Campbell (composer) (born 1948), Canadian-American musician and arranger
David Campbell (clarinetist) (born 1953), British classical clarinetist 
David Campbell (singer) (born 1973), Australian singer, stage actor and television presenter
David Paul Campbell, American musician and songwriter

Politics
David Campbell (Virginia politician) (1779–1859), Governor of Virginia, 1837–1840
David Campbell (Manitoba politician) (1870–1932), Manitoba Liberal Party leader
David Robb Campbell (1874/5–1934), Irish trade unionist and politician
Sir David Campbell (MP) (1891–1963), Northern Irish politician
David Campbell (Australian politician) (born 1957), New South Wales Police and Transport Minister
David Campbell (New Hampshire politician) (born 1957), New Hampshire House of Representatives
David Campbell (Northern Ireland politician, born 1965) (born 1965), Northern Ireland politician and businessman

Sports
 David Campbell (American football) (1873–1949)
 David Campbell (baseball), Negro league baseball player
 David Campbell (athlete) (born 1960), Canadian Olympic middle-distance runner
 David Campbell (footballer) (born 1965), Northern Irish footballer
 Chad Campbell (David Chad Campbell, born 1974), American professional golfer
 David Campbell (Ninja Warrior) (born 1977), American athlete

Other
 David Callender Campbell (naturalist) (1860–1926), Irish businessman and naturalist
 Sir David Campbell (British Army officer) (1869–1936), British general and jockey, Governor of Malta
 Sir David Campbell (pharmacologist) (1889–1978), Scottish physician and pharmacologist
 David N. Campbell (born 1941), American charity executive, All Hands Volunteers founder and chairman
 David Campbell (admiral) (born 1945), Australian rear admiral, Deputy Chief of Navy
 David James Campbell (born 1983), Australian advertising executive
 David P. Campbell, American psychologist
 David Campbell (1912 fireboat), a fireboat built in 1912 for Oregon's Portland Fire and Rescue
 David Campbell (1927 fireboat), a fireboat built in 1928 for Oregon's Portland Fire and Rescue

See also
Dave Campbell (disambiguation)
 Campbell (surname)